Thyasira gouldi, common name the Northern hatchet-shell, is a species of saltwater clam, a marine bivalve mollusc in the family Thyasiridae.

This species has been fully protected since 1992 in the United Kingdom under the Wildlife and Countryside Act 1981.

References

External links 
 http://www.ukbap.org.uk/UKPlans.aspx?ID=605

Thyasiridae